Piornedo is a small village in the Ancares mountains in Spain located at a height of approximately 1,300 metres. The village is part of the parish of Donis (official name San Fiz de Donis), which is located in the municipality of Cervantes, in the comarca of Os Ancares, in the province of Lugo, Galicia. 

Piornedo is famous for its museum, a preserved palloza or traditional house, that shows how people lived in this remote region until comparatively recently.  It is now a centre for tourism, especially for walkers, and has a small hotel, guest houses, restaurants and a bar.

External links
On foot in Spain (Travel operator)
History of Galicia (in Spanish)

Populated places in the Province of Lugo
Towns in Spain